Raúl Alberto Loaiza Morelos (born 8 June 1994) is a Colombian professional footballer who plays as a defensive midfielder for Lanús.

Club career
Having spent part of his youth career with Academia Crespo, Loaiza began his senior career with Patriotas of Categoría Primera A. His professional debut came on 2 February 2013 during a 1–1 draw with Boyacá Chicó, which was the first of thirteen appearances in all competitions during the 2013 Categoría Primera A season. He scored two goals in the subsequent campaign, notably netting his first in a win against Atlético Huila in February 2014; the other came two months later in a 2–2 versus Envigado. He remained with Patriotas for the next three campaigns, taking his total appearance tally for them to one hundred and twenty-nine.

2017 saw Atlético Nacional complete the signing of Loaiza. Thirty-one appearances followed across 2017 and 2018. In December 2018, Loaiza agreed a loan move to San Lorenzo of the Argentine Primera División; effective from January 2019. He played seventeen times for them. On 25 July, Loaiza penned a permanent contract with fellow Argentine top-flight team Defensa y Justicia; signing for three years. Loaiza left Defense at the end of June 2022, to join fellow league club Lanús on a deal until the end of 2025.

International career
Loaiza represented the Colombia U23s at international level under manager Carlos Restrepo. He was part of the squad that won a 2015 international friendly tournament in China. In May 2019, Loaiza received his first call-up to the senior team from Carlos Queiroz ahead of the Copa América in Brazil.

Career statistics
.

Honours
Atlético Nacional
Categoría Primera A: 2017 Apertura
Copa Colombia: 2018

References

External links

1994 births
Living people
Sportspeople from Cartagena, Colombia
Colombian footballers
Colombia youth international footballers
Association football midfielders
Colombian expatriate footballers
Categoría Primera A players
Argentine Primera División players
Patriotas Boyacá footballers
Atlético Nacional footballers
San Lorenzo de Almagro footballers
Defensa y Justicia footballers
Club Atlético Lanús footballers
Expatriate footballers in Argentina
Colombian expatriate sportspeople in Argentina